Tillandsia lepidosepala is a species of flowering plant in the genus Tillandsia. This species is native to Mexico.

References

Sample photos on FCBS

lepidosepala
Flora of Mexico